Pamulaparthi Sadasiva Rao (17 July 1921 – 26 August 1996) was a thinker, philosopher, and free lance journalist. He started the monthly magazine Kakatiya Patrika in 1944 in Warangal, India, in 1948 with his cousin P. V. Narasimha Rao, later Prime Minister of India.

Early life
Sadasiva Rao was born in Warangal to Durgabai and Hanumantha Rao.  He was educated at the then  Collegiate High School, Hanamkonda in Warangal district of the then Hyderabad State.

Literary career
Among his Telugu writings were GatiTarkika Bhotika Vadam (on dialectic materialism), Charitra, Sanskriti, Kala (history, tradition, culture and art), and Tatva Shastra Praadhamika Paathalu (fundamentals of philosophy).

He translated Theory of Knowledge, an English language book by Maurice Cornforth,  into the Telugu Gyana Siddhantam, published by the Visalandhra Publishing House.

Death
He died of cancer on 26 August 1996.

Commemoration
There is a memorial trust and an annual Pamulaparthi Sadasiva Rao endowment lecture at Kakatiya University.

References

External links

Further reading
Ekashila Vaithalikulu, Edited by T.Ranga Swamy, Srilekha Sahithi, Warangal,1991 (Pages 27–36)
Kovela Suprasannacharyulu- Vajmaya Jeevitha Suchika, T.Ranga Swamy, Visalandhra Book House, 1991 (Pages 5,6)

People from Warangal
1921 births
1996 deaths
Telugu poets
Journalists from Telangana
Indian male poets
20th-century Indian writers
Indian male journalists
Poets from Telangana
20th-century Indian male writers